Salvador Sadurní Urpí (born 3 April 1941) is a Spanish retired footballer who played as a goalkeeper.

Club career
Sadurní was born in L'Arboç, Tarragona, Catalonia. After one season on loan to neighbours CE Mataró he returned to alma mater FC Barcelona, where he remained for the rest of his 16-year career. He appeared in nine games in his first season in La Liga, and engaged in a battle for first-choice status with José Manuel Pesudo in the following years, subsequently becoming the undisputed starter.

In 1969, Sadurní lost his starting position to Miguel Reina, but regained it four years later after the latter left for Atlético Madrid. In the 1973–74 campaign he won the second of his third Ricardo Zamora Trophy awards, as Barça won the national championship and finished with the best defensive record in the competition (just 24 goals conceded in 34 matches); he retired at the age of 35, after a testimonial match against Stade de Reims.

International career
Sadurní earned ten caps for Spain during six and a half years, his debut coming on 9 January 1963 in a friendly against France held at the familiar Camp Nou (0–0). He was a backup for the national team at both the 1962 FIFA World Cup and 1964 European Nations' Cup tournaments, and his last appearance was on 25 June 1969, in a 0–2 loss in Finland for the 1970 World Cup qualifiers.

Honours

Club
Barcelona
La Liga: 1973–74
Copa del Generalísimo: 1962–63, 1967–68, 1970–71
Inter-Cities Fairs Cup: 1965–66, 1971 Trophy Play-Off

International
Spain
European Nations' Cup: 1964

Individual
Ricardo Zamora Trophy: 1968–69, 1973–74, 1974–75

References

External links

FC Barcelona profile

1941 births
Living people
People from Baix Penedès
Sportspeople from the Province of Tarragona
Spanish footballers
Footballers from Catalonia
Association football goalkeepers
La Liga players
FC Barcelona players
CE Mataró players
Spain international footballers
1962 FIFA World Cup players
1964 European Nations' Cup players
UEFA European Championship-winning players
Catalonia international footballers